United States v. Ballard, 322 U.S. 78 (1944), was a United States Supreme Court case from the October 1943 term.

The case arose from the appeal of the conviction of two leaders of the new religious "I AM" Activity movement for fraudulently seeking and collecting donations on the basis of religious claims that the defendants themselves did not believe.  

The Supreme Court held that the question of whether the defendants' claims about their religious experiences were actually true should not have been submitted to a jury.  The Court arrived at this conclusion in part because the "freedom of religious belief... embraces the right to maintain theories of life and of death and of the hereafter which are rank heresy to followers of the orthodox faiths." However, the Court did not address the issue of whether the sincerity of the defendants' beliefs was a proper question for the jury.

Justice Robert H. Jackson, dissenting, would have gone even farther, suggesting that the entire case should be dismissed for coming too close to being an investigation into the truth of a religious conviction. He would have held unconstitutional a jury determination of whether the defendants' religious beliefs were sincere, as well as whether they were true.

Prior history 

After Guy Ballard's death, his wife, Edna Anne Wheeler Ballard, and son, Donald Ballard, were indicted for 18 counts of fraud.  The indictment charged that the Ballards fraudulently collected over $3 million from their followers on the basis of religious claims the Ballards knew were false.  Their followers protested outside the courthouse.

The District Court instructed the jury to convict if they found that the Ballards did not have a good faith belief in their religious claims.  The Ballards were convicted.

The United States Court of Appeals for the Ninth Circuit overturned the conviction and granted a new trial, declaring that the District Court erred in restricting the issue to whether the defendants had a good faith belief in their claims. The government appealed to the Supreme Court.

Decision

Majority opinion 
Written by: William O. Douglas; joined by: Black, Reed, Murphy, Rutledge

The majority opinion reversed the decision of the Court of Appeals and remanded the case to that court, ruling that the question of the truth or falsity of the beliefs had been rightly withheld from the jury.  There was no ruling on the propriety of the jury instructions regarding the sincerity of the defendants' beliefs. In his majority opinion, Justice Douglas wrote:
The religious views espoused by respondents might seem incredible, if not preposterous, to most people. But if those doctrines are subject to trial before a jury charged with finding their truth or falsity, then the same can be done with the religious beliefs of any sect. When the triers of fact undertake that task, they enter a forbidden domain. The First Amendment does not select any one group or any one type of religion for preferred treatment. It puts them all in that position.

Chief Justice Stone's dissent 
Written by: Stone; joined by: Roberts, Frankfurter

Chief Justice Stone, dissenting, argued that the question of truthfulness was appropriate for the jury:
I am not prepared to say that the constitutional guarantee of freedom of religion affords immunity from criminal prosecution for the fraudulent procurement of money by false statements as to one's religious experiences, more than it renders polygamy or libel immune from criminal prosecution... I cannot say that freedom of thought and worship includes freedom to procure money by making knowingly false statements about one's religious experiences.

Justice Jackson's dissent 
Justice Jackson dissented because he believed that the First Amendment foreclosed inquiry into both the truthfulness of the defendants' religious claims and their sincerity. He would have dismissed the case entirely for being too close to a religious persecution:
 
I should say the defendants have done just that for which they are indicted. If I might agree to their conviction without creating a precedent, I cheerfully would do so. I can see in their teachings nothing but humbug, untainted by any trace of truth. But that does not dispose of the constitutional question whether misrepresentation of religious experience or belief is prosecutable; it rather emphasizes the danger of such prosecutions.

Prosecutions of this character easily could degenerate into religious persecution.
I would dismiss the indictment and have done with this business of judicially examining other people's faiths.
All schools of religious thought make enormous assumptions, generally on the basis of revelations authenticated by some sign or miracle.
Some who profess belief in the Bible read literally what others read as allegory or metaphor, as they read Aesop's fables.
If we try religious sincerity severed from religious verity, we isolate the dispute from the very considerations which, in common experience, provide its most reliable answer.
William James, who wrote on these matters as a scientist, reminds us that it is not theology and ceremonies which keep religion going. Its vitality is in the religious experiences of many people.  "If you ask what these experiences are, they are conversations with the unseen, voices and visions, responses to prayer, changes of heart, deliverances from fear, inflowings of help, assurances of support, whenever certain persons set their own internal attitude in certain appropriate ways."
If religious liberty includes, as it must, the right to communicate such experiences to others, it seems to me an impossible task for juries to separate fancied ones from real ones, dreams from happenings, and hallucinations from true clairvoyance. Such experiences, like some tones and colors, have existence for one, but none at all for another. They cannot be verified to the minds of those whose field of consciousness does not include religious insight. When one comes to trial which turns on any aspect of religious belief or representation, unbelievers among his judges are likely not to understand, and are almost certain not to believe, him.

Subsequent history 

On remand to the United States Court of Appeals for the Ninth Circuit the original conviction was affirmed without rehearing by the Court of Appeals. The defendants once again petitioned for a writ of certiorari and it was once again granted, this time on the issue of women being excluded from grand jury and the trial jury. The Supreme Court ruled in favor of the defendants and dismissed the indictment as well as the subsequent conviction.

See also 
 List of United States Supreme Court cases, volume 322

References

External links
 
 

United States Supreme Court cases
United States Supreme Court cases of the Stone Court
United States free exercise of religion case law
1944 in United States case law
1944 in religion